Galina Vicheva Gencheva known professionally as Galena, is a Bulgarian pop-folk singer.

Biography and personal life
Galena was born May 21, 1985 in the village of Smyadovo, Bulgaria. She has studied folk singing at the music school of Shumen for 4 years. Two years after that she moved town and continued her music education in Dimitrovgrad.

In February 2008, Galena was engaged to her boyfriend Galin. On June 22, 2009 they had their first child, Stefan. On February 17, 2017 they welcomed a second son - Aleksandar.

Career

2004–2006: The beginning: Galya and Galena 
Galena was discovered by the singer Milko Kalaydzhiev. She started her career under the stage name Galya and recorded her first single "Можеш ли" (lit. Can You?) in 2004.

Her debut studio album was named after her - Galena and was released under the Payner Music label on 21 May 2006 - the singer's 21st birthday. The album consists of 12 songs, 3 of which unheard before.

On 31 October 2007, a short pornographic video with her in it was leaked on the internet. The clip was quickly gaining popularity in Bulgarian media - thousands of views, articles in online and traditional media. One of the most popular magazines at the time Blyasuk called it "Hit of the year".

On 12 September her second album „След 12“ (lit. After Midnight) was released, and she introduced her single "Неплатена сметка" (lit. Unpaid Bill) on Planeta TV's Christmas programme.

2010–2011: "Aз" (lit. Me)

2012–2015: "Кой" (lit. Who)

2016–Present 

Galena has since has collaborated with a great number of Bulgarian artists including Niki Nankov, Malina, Preslava and Andrea and is currently one of the most popular singers in the country.

From 2021-2022, Galena was a coach on The Voice of Bulgaria. In her first series as a coach, Petya Paneva, a member of her team, won the competition on 12 December 2021. On 5 May 2022, it was announced that Galena would return as a coach in September 2022. On 5 December, a day after the finale of the ninth season, Galena announced she would not be returning to the show.

Other projects 
In 2013 she created her own line for Beyond, called G Spot - Galena for Beyond. The singer is working in collaboration with her stylist Dobromir Kiryakov and Borche Ristovski.

Awards
Planeta TV Awards
Following is a list of awards Galena won under the Planeta TV Awards.

Nov Folk Magazine Awards 
2007: Best young performer
2008: Best cover version
2009: Best Video of the Year
2010: Song of the Year (for "Тихо ми пази")
2011: Album of the Year (for Аз), Best stage act
Others
2006: Скопски филиграни, Macedonia – second Award of the Audience
2010 and 2011: Pop act of the year by Signal.bg readers

Discography

Albums
Studio albums
2006: Galena 
2008: След 12
2010: Официално Забранен
2011: Аз
2015: Кой

Compilation albums
2013: Златните Хитове На Галена (Golden Hits of Galena)

Video albums / DVDs
2008: Galena Best Video Selection
2011: Az DVD

Singles
2014: "Body Language"

Videos / Songs
From album Galena: 
2004: Само миг
2005: Дъждовно реге
2005: Екстаз
2006: Чупката 
From album След 12
2006: Душата ми крещи
2007: Намерих те (with Boris Dali)
2007: Вземи си дъх
2007: Утешителна награда
2008: Нищо общо (with Expose)
2008: Сама (with DJ Damyan)
2008: Страст на кристали (with Ustata)
2008: След 12
2008: 100 пъти
From album Официално Забранен: 
2008: Знам диагнозата
2009: Дяволът ме кара
2009: Нещастница
2009: Мой (with Malina feat. Fatih Ürek)
2009: За последно
2009: Лоша ли съм
2010: На две големи
2010: Тихо ми пази
From album Аз: 
2010: Запали
2010: За пари
2010: Аларма (with Malina and Emilia)
2011: С кое право
2011: Хайде, откажи ме (with Preslava)
2011: Да ти го дам ли
2011: DJ-ят ме издаде (Remix)
2011: Неудобни въпроси (with Gamzata)
2011: Създай игра (with Kristo)
2011: След раздялата
2011: Ще се проваля
2011: Искам да останем будни
2011: Знам как
2011: Мразя да те обичам
2011: Тоя става
2011: Не пред хората
From album Кой: 
2013: Vatreno, vatreno (with MC Stojan)
2013: Кой (with Fiki)
2014: Хавана Тропикана (with DJ Jivko Mix)
2014: Боже, прости (with Fiki)
2015: Пантера (with Sergio)
2015: В твоите очи (with Desi Slava)
2015: Te quiero (with Akcent)
Various 
2004: Можеш ли
2009: Много сладко (with Malina)
2010: Блясък на кристали (with Andrea)
2012: Спри ме
2012: Много ми отиваш
2012: Пак ли
2013: Бутилка (with Preslava and Boris Dali)
2013: Истински щастлива
2013: Дай ми
2014: Body language
2015: Стара каравана
2015: Една жена
2015: Коледа (with Tsvetelina Yaneva and Galin)
2016: Да ти олекне.
2016: Пей сърце (with Tsvetelina Yaneva feat. Azis)
2016: #МамаУраган
2017: Moro mou (Бебето ми)
2017: #TheBo$$
2017: Изневериш ли ми (with Fiki)
2017: #JustShow
2018: #GiveMeLove
2018: Маракеш (with Tsvetelina Yaneva)
2018: Феноменален 
2019: Сърце
2019: Добре ли си (with Mile Kitić)
2019: Паника
2019: Ламборгини (with Fiki)
2020: 100 живота
2020: Красиви лъжи (with Krisko)
2020: Куршум (with Donika and Medi)
2020: Кавала кючек (with Krisko)
2021: Къде беше ти
2021: Скандал  (with Medi)
2021: Ти не си за мен
2021: Тръпката (with Krisko)
2021: А+Г=ВНЛ (with Azis)
2022: Euphoria

References

External links
Official website

21st-century Bulgarian women singers
Bulgarian folk-pop singers
1985 births
Living people
Bulgarian folk singers
Payner artists